Cota tinctoria, the golden marguerite, yellow chamomile, or oxeye chamomile, is a species of perennial flowering plant in the sunflower family. Other common names include dyer's chamomile, Boston daisy, and Paris daisy. In horticulture this plant is still widely referred to by its synonym Anthemis tinctoria.

It is a short-lived plant often treated as biennial, native to Europe, the Mediterranean and Western Asia and naturalized in scattered locations in North America. It has aromatic, bright green, feathery foliage. The serrate leaves are bi-pinnatifid (= finely divided) and downy beneath.

It has yellow daisy-like terminal flower heads on long thin angular stems, blooming in profusion during the summer.

It has no culinary or commercial uses and only limited medicinal uses. However, it produces excellent yellow, buff and golden-orange dyes, used in the past for fabrics.

Cota tinctoria is grown in gardens for its bright attractive flowers and fine lacy foliage; there is a white-flowering form. Under the synonym Anthemis tinctoria, the cultivar ‘E.C. Buxton’ has gained the Royal Horticultural Society’s Award of Garden Merit. The popular seed-raised cultivar 'Kelwayi' has 5 cm wide, yellow flowers on 65 cm plants.

Subspecies
 Cota tinctoria subsp. australis (R.Fern.) Oberpr. & Greuter
 Cota tinctoria subsp. euxina (Boiss.) Oberpr. & Greuter
 Cota tinctoria subsp. fussii (Griseb. & Schenk) Oberpr. & Greuter 
 Cota tinctoria subsp. gaudium-solis (Velen.) Oberpr. & Greuter
 Cota tinctoria subsp. parnassica (Boiss. & Heldr.) Oberpr. & Greuter
 Cota tinctoria subsp. sancti-johannis (Stoj. & al.) Oberpr. & Greuter 
 Cota tinctoria subsp. virescens (Bornm.) Oberpr. & Greuter

References

External links

Anthemideae
Medicinal plants of Africa
Medicinal plants of Asia
Medicinal plants of Europe
Garden plants of Asia
Garden plants of Europe
Plant dyes
Flora of Europe
Flora of Asia
Plants described in 1753
Taxa named by Carl Linnaeus